Rubus hochstetterorum  is a rare species of flowering plant in the rose family. It has been found only in the Azores Islands in the North Atlantic, part of Portugal.

References

External links
Nome científico: Rubus hochstetterorum Seub. Nome comum: Silvado-manso, Silva-mansa photos

hochstetterorum
Plants described in 1844
Endemic flora of the Azores